Patos de Minas is an octahedrite meteorite. It was found in 1925 and 2002 in Patos de Minas, Minas Gerais, Brazil. It is rough, elongated and very weathered.

See also 
 Collection of meteorites in the National Museum of Brazil
 Glossary of meteoritics

References

External links

 Meteoritos Brasileiros 

Meteorites found in Brazil
National Museum of Brazil
1925 archaeological discoveries
2002 archaeological discoveries